Isabella Nielsen (born 21 August 1995) is a Danish badminton player.

Achievements

BWF International Challenge/Series (1 title, 8 runners-up) 
Women's doubles

Mixed doubles

  BWF International Challenge tournament
  BWF International Series tournament
  BWF Future Series tournament

References

External links 
 

1995 births
Living people
Danish female badminton players